Michael Joseph Roesler (born September 12, 1963) is a retired Major League Baseball pitcher. He played during two seasons at the major league level for the Cincinnati Reds and Pittsburgh Pirates. He was drafted by the Reds in the 17th round of the 1985 amateur draft. Roesler played his first professional season with their Rookie league Billings Mustangs in 1985, and his last with the Kansas City Royals' Double-A Memphis Chicks and Triple-A Omaha Royals in 1993. When he was called up to the majors he struck Will Clark as 1 out of 18 strikeouts in the big leagues. Roeslers last professional appearance was in 1 game for the Brother Elephants of the Chinese Professional Baseball League.

Before being drafted he attended Bishop Luers High School in Fort Wayne, Indiana. He then went to Ball State University and was a four-year letterman.

External links
"Mike Roesler Statistics". The Baseball Cube. 19 January 2008.
"Mike Roesler Statistics". Baseball-Reference. 19 January 2008.

1963 births
Living people
Ball State Cardinals baseball players
Cincinnati Reds players
Pittsburgh Pirates players
Major League Baseball pitchers
Baseball players from Indiana
Nashville Sounds players
Vermont Reds players
Billings Mustangs players
Cedar Rapids Reds players
Tampa Tarpons (1957–1987) players
Chattanooga Lookouts players
Buffalo Bisons (minor league) players
Memphis Chicks players
Omaha Royals players
Carolina Mudcats players
Harrisburg Senators players
People from Fort Wayne, Indiana
American expatriate baseball players in Taiwan
Brother Elephants players